The India national netball team is the national netball team of India. The team competed at the 2010 Commonwealth Games in Delhi, for the first time. India were coached by Panchali Take and Amit Sharma, who took over from Mary Murcia Lourdes one month before the start of the Games. Prachi Tehlan captained the team, which finished 12th. As of 27 January 2013, India were 29th in the IFNA World Rankings.

Tournament record

Asian Netball Championships
1985 – 5th
1989 – 4th
1993 – 5th
1997 – 4th
2001 – 6th
2005 – 7th
2009 – 7th
2012 – 5th
2014 – 6th
2018 – 8th
2022 – 8th

Commonwealth Games
2010 – 12th place

South Asian Beach Games
2011 –  Silver medal

Squad 2018
The squad for the 2018 Asian Netball Championships:

 Pallavi Kumari
 Kirti Mor (captain)
 Megha Chaudhary
 Ruchi
 Pooja Chopra
 Gurpreet Kaur
 Ranjitha Badenahalli Jagadeesh (vice-captain)
 Nandini Laxmisagar Gopalakrishnappa
 Aanchal Chauhan
 Ayushi Sharma
 Rajita
 Jyoti Sharma
 Nidhi Sharma

Squad 2022
The squad for the 2022 Asian Netball Championships
 Sonam (Captain)
 Meghana B C (Vice Captain)
 Kirti
 Ruchi
 Kushi Kumar
 Jaswinder Kaur
 Aishwarya
 Suhani Takker
 Surya Sangwan
 Sunaina
 Manisha
 Vibha Kumari
 Head coach: Suman Kaushik 
 Asst. Coach: Vivek Kumar Sain 
 Manager : B Vikramadhitya Reddy

Notable players
Prachi Tehlan
Priyanka Shah

See also
 Netball in India

References

Netball
 National netball teams of Asia
 Netball in India